Petra Maria Paulina Vaarakallio (born 17 June 1975 in Helsinki) is a Finnish retired ice hockey player and ringette player. She played on the women's ice hockey team for Finland at the 1998 Winter Olympics, and won a bronze medal. Vaarakallio scored the first-ever goal in women's ice hockey at the Olympics.

Vaarakallio won the 1992 World Ringette Championships bronze. She stopped playing ringette after receiving a six-month suspension for kicking an opponent who was lying on the ice.

References

External links
 
 

1975 births
Living people
Finnish women's ice hockey forwards
Ice hockey players at the 2002 Winter Olympics
Ice hockey players at the 1998 Winter Olympics
Medalists at the 1998 Winter Olympics
Olympic bronze medalists for Finland
Olympic ice hockey players of Finland
Olympic medalists in ice hockey
Kiekko-Espoo Naiset players
Espoo Blues Naiset players
Ice hockey people from Helsinki
Ringette players